Mlinište is a settlement in the Municipality of Mrkonjić Grad of the Republika Srpska entity of Bosnia and Herzegovina on the border of the Federation of Bosnia and Herzegovina (FBiH).

Name 
Mlinište was once called Kaldrma and it got the name Mlinište by the flat mills in the area.

Demographics 
According to the 1991 census, the village had a total of 19 inhabitants. Ethnic groups in the village include:

 Serbs: 19 (100%)

According to the 2013 census, the village had a total of 6 inhabitants. Ethnic groups in the village include:

 Serbs 6 (100%)

References

Notes

Bibliography 

Populated places in Republika Srpska